La Distancia (translated: The Distance) is the debut EP of Argentine Post hardcore act Deny originally released in 2009 via Inmune Records. The EP was re-released on February 24, 2012, via Pinhead Records. The re-issue contains two acoustic versions of E.X.E and Lo Que Siempre Buscabámos from the debut album Reino de Tormentas. Both issues were produced by Nueva Ética guitarist Javier Casas at Infire Studios.

With the re-release of La Distancia with two bonus tracks, fans of DENY and the musicians themselves describe La Distancia as their official second album.

Track list

Personnel 
Deny
 Nazareno Gomez Antolini – screamed vocals
 Joaquín Ortega – guitars, clean vocals
 Mateo Sevillano – lead guitars
 Juan Pablo Uberti – bass guitar, clean vocals
 Agustín Dupuis – drums

Production
 Produced, mixed and mastered by Javier Casas

References

2009 EPs
2012 EPs
Deny (band) EPs
Pinhead Records albums